East Danville (also known as Winkle) is an unincorporated community in Highland County, Ohio, United States.

History
The post office at East Danville was called Winkle. This post office was established in 1880, and remained in operation until 1969.

Gallery

References

Unincorporated communities in Highland County, Ohio
Unincorporated communities in Ohio